Ransford Doherty (born March 5) is an American actor, known for his supporting role as Kendall in The Closer (2008–2012) and its crossover series Major Crimes (2012–2017), as well as the films Something Like a Business alongside Kevin Hart, and Hostage with Bruce Willis.

Early life 
Doherty was born in Washington, D.C.. He attended C.D. Hylton High School and studied theatre performance at Longwood University, moving to Los Angeles to pursue acting shortly afterwards.

Career 
Doherty's first screen appearances began in 2000, when he appeared in episodes of JAG, ER, NYPD Blue, and had a guest run as Marco on MTV's Undressed. He would go on to have guest roles in numerous shows through the 2000s, including Malcolm in the Middle, Las Vegas, Bones, Girlfriends, and The Office. He played Kendall in The Closer, a role he held from 2008 through 2017. Doherty recently appeared on Shameless and NCIS.

Doherty also works as a teacher throughout the Los Angeles area, working with special education students.

Filmography

Film

Television

References

Living people
Date of birth missing (living people)
African-American male actors
21st-century American male actors
Longwood University alumni
People from Washington, D.C.
21st-century African-American people
Year of birth missing (living people)